Travelling Salesman is a 2012 intellectual thriller film about four mathematicians who solve the P versus NP problem, one of the most challenging mathematical problems in history. The title refers to the travelling salesman problem, an optimization problem that acts like a key to solving other difficult mathematical problems. It has been proven that a quick travelling salesman algorithm, if one exists, could be converted into quick algorithms for many other difficult tasks, such as factoring large numbers. Since many cryptographic schemes rely on the difficulty of factoring integers to protect their data, a quick solution would enable access to encrypted private data like personal correspondence, bank accounts and, possibly, government secrets.

The story was written and directed by Timothy Lanzone and premiered at the International House in Philadelphia on June 16, 2012.  After screenings in eight countries, spanning four continents, including screenings at the University of Pennsylvania and the University of Cambridge,  the film was released globally on September 10, 2013.

Plot 
The four mathematicians are gathered and meet with a top official of the United States Department of Defense. After some discussion, the group agrees that they must be wary with whom to trust and control their solution. The official offers them a reward of $10 million in exchange for their portion of the algorithm, swaying them by attempting to address their concerns. Only one of the four speaks out against the sale, and in doing so is forced to reveal a dark truth about his portion of the solution. Before they sign a license to the government, however, they wrestle with the ethical consequences of their discovery.

Critical reception 
The film premiered in Philadelphia, Pennsylvania on June 16, 2012, and early reviews were favorable:

Mathematicians who have discussed the film praised the writer's attempt to bring a serious math problem to the big screen, although they questioned whether the world would be as dramatically affected by its solution:

The film also garnered favorable reviews after the University of Cambridge screening:

Awards and recognition
2012 Silicon Valley Film Festival - Best Feature Film, Best Lead Actor (Danny Barclay), Best Editing (Christopher McGlynn) .

2012 New York International Film Festival - Official Selection.

See also
 Complexity theory
 List of films featuring mathematicians
 NP-hardness
 P-hardness

References

External links 
 
 
 Director's Interview at the Internet Movie Database.

2012 films
American thriller films
Films about mathematics
2010s English-language films
2010s American films